Shakhunya is a town in Nizhny Novgorod Oblast, Russia, located on the Nizhny Novgorod–Kirov railway,  northeast of Nizhny Novgorod. Population:

History
It was founded as a settlement around the Shakhunya railway station, which was opened in 1927. It was granted work settlement status in 1938 and town status in 1943.

Administrative and municipal status
Within the framework of administrative divisions, it is, together with 2 work settlements and 136 rural localities, incorporated as the town of oblast significance of Shakhunya—an administrative unit with the status equal to that of the districts. As a municipal division, the town of oblast significance of Shakhunya is incorporated as Shakhunya Urban Okrug.

References

Notes

Sources

Cities and towns in Nizhny Novgorod Oblast
Cities and towns built in the Soviet Union
Shakhunya Urban Okrug